"Bring It Up", also known as "Bring It Up (Hipster's Avenue)", is a song recorded by James Brown. It was released as a single in 1967 and charted #7 R&B and #29 Pop. It also appeared on the album James Brown Sings Raw Soul. An unedited version of the song was released on the 1991 box set Star Time.

Live performances of the song appear on the albums Live at the Garden and Live at the Apollo, Volume II.

References

External links
 AllMusic review

James Brown songs
Songs written by James Brown
1967 singles
1967 songs
King Records (United States) singles